Carlos Romero Quintanilla (born July 24, 1966 in La Union) is a former Salvadorean professional footballer and who currently manager of Jocoro.

His brother is also a coach.

Titles

Managerial stats

References

External links
 

1966 births
Living people
Salvadoran footballers
Salvadoran football managers
Association footballers not categorized by position